Morea is an unincorporated community and census-designated place (CDP) in Schuylkill County, Pennsylvania, United States. It was first listed as a CDP prior to the 2020 census. Prior to that, it was part of the New Boston-Morea CDP.

Morea is in northern Schuylkill County, in the southwestern part of Mahanoy Township.

To the southwest, Morea Road leads  to Frackville. Interstate 81 passes just south of Morea, with access from exits near Frackville and Mahanoy City.

Demographics

References 

Census-designated places in Schuylkill County, Pennsylvania
Census-designated places in Pennsylvania